John Darling Terry (September 3, 1845 – March 4, 1919) was a United States Army soldier who fought in the American Civil War. Terry received the Medal of Honor for bravery during combat. Terry's medal was won for "extraordinary heroism" during the Battle of New Bern in North Carolina on March 14, 1862. He was honored with the award on October 12, 1867.

Terry was born in Montville, Maine. He joined the Army from Boston, Massachusetts, in September 1861, and was discharged due to the loss of his leg in March 1863. While recovering in Manhattan, New York he volunteered for service during the draft riots.  He commanded a body of convalescent soldiers in July 1863 and on day three of the riots he received word that he was re-entering service as a lieutenant in the 1st North Carolina Colored Volunteers (later known as the 35th U.S. Colored Infantry), a regiment he fought with until the war's end.  On May 23, 1865, after the official end of the war, Terry was promoted to captain.  However, in the aftermath of the war's end and due to prejudice against officers working with the former slaves, his promotion was withdrawn.  In September of 1865 Terry was assigned to the Freedman's Bureau and while there was brevetted promotions to captain and major before his discharge.   He died in Manhattan on March 4, 1919,  and was buried at Woodlawn Cemetery (Bronx, New York), Butternut Plot, Section 141, Lot 14454.

His official rank remained lieutenant until 2013, almost 150 years later, when his great-grandson and other family members petitioned the ABCMR to reinstate his official rank of captain. After careful review the board determined that the evidence presented was sufficient and corrected the record reinstating Terry's permanent rank to captain.

Medal of Honor citation

See also
List of American Civil War Medal of Honor recipients: T–Z

References

1845 births
1919 deaths
American Civil War recipients of the Medal of Honor
American amputees
People of Maine in the American Civil War
People from Montville, Maine
Union Army officers
United States Army Medal of Honor recipients